Picking Up the Pieces is a 2000 black comedy film directed by Alfonso Arau and starring Woody Allen, David Schwimmer, Maria Grazia Cucinotta, Kiefer Sutherland, Cheech Marin, and Sharon Stone.

Plot
Tex (Woody Allen) is a butcher who kills his unfaithful wife Candy (Sharon Stone). After cutting up the body, Tex buries most of her body parts in the desert in New Mexico. A blind woman accidentally trips over Candy's hand, which has not been buried. Picking it up, her sight is restored, and she proclaims the hand to be the "Hand of the Virgin Mary."

The hand then becomes the talk of the village and people flock there to heal themselves. This ranges from a crippled man growing new legs, a teenager being relieved of his acne and a little person having his manhood enlarged. Tex hears of these miracles, and attempts to retrieve the hand while being pursued by patrol officer Bobo (Kiefer Sutherland) who was one of his wife's lovers.

Eventually, Tex and the officer track down the hand, with Tex's theft of the hand undoing all the miracles that it has performed. While Tex is in prison, he is visited by his wife's spirit, who reveals that, despite her life of whoring and adultery, the suffering she endured with Tex allowed her to get into Heaven, and she arranges for him to get out of his cell so that he can return the hand to the church.

Cast
Woody Allen as Tex Cowley
David Schwimmer as Father Leo Jerome
Kiefer Sutherland as Officer Bobo
Cheech Marin as Mayor Machado
Maria Grazia Cucinotta as Desi
Elliott Gould as Father LaCage
Sharon Stone as Candy Cowley
Joseph Gordon-Levitt as Flaco
Angélica Aragón as Dolores
Andy Dick as Father Buñuel
Alfonso Arau as Dr. Amado
Mia Maestro as Carla
Lou Diamond Phillips as Officer Alfonso
Fran Drescher as Sister Frida
Eddie Griffin as Sediento
Kathy Kinney as Mrs. Tattler

Production
In an interview, Cheech Marin said that he agreed to make the film because Woody Allen was part of the cast.

Reception
Although the film has many movie stars, including Allen's close friend, Elliott Gould, Cheech Marin still called Picking Up the Pieces the worst film he had ever starred in.

References

External links 
 
 
 

2000 films
2000 black comedy films
2000 independent films
American black comedy films
American independent films
Films about murder
Films set in New Mexico
Films directed by Alfonso Arau
2000 comedy films
The Kushner-Locke Company films
Uxoricide in fiction
2000s English-language films
2000s American films